Gerrit Kruize (May 2, 1923 – May 11, 2009) was an American field hockey player who competed at the 1956 Summer Olympics. He was born in the Netherlands but immigrated to the United States and became a US citizen on June 23, 1955, in White Plains, NY. His brother Roepie and nephews Hans, Hidde and Ties were Dutch Olympic field hockey players.

References

External links
 

1946 births
2009 deaths
Olympic field hockey players of the United States
American male field hockey players
Field hockey players at the 1956 Summer Olympics
Dutch male field hockey players
Dutch emigrants to the United States
Sportspeople from Apeldoorn